Ruchita Vinerkar is an Indian sport shooter. She won the Gold in the women’s 10m air pistol team event at the ISSF Shooting World Cup in Cairo.

References

Living people
1992 births
Indian female sport shooters
ISSF rifle shooters